Ballan is a surname. Notable people with the surname include:

Alessandro Ballan (born 1979), Italian cyclist
Fahd Ballan (1933–1997), Syrian singer
Giada Ballan (born 1973), Italian synchronized swimmer
Hani Ballan (born 1967), Qatari football executive
Sam Ballan (1911–1998), known by his pen name Sam Marcy, American Marxist
Yousef Hani Ballan ((born 1996), Qatari football player